Dubovenka is a rural locality (a khutor) in Shebekinsky District, Belgorod Oblast, Russia. The population was 14 as of 2010. There is 1 street.

Geography 
Dubovenka is located 59 km northeast of Shebekino (the district's administrative centre) by road. Bulanovka is the nearest rural locality.

References 

Rural localities in Shebekinsky District